Alla Zinovievna Budnitskaya (born 1937, Moscow) is a Soviet and Russian actress of theater and cinema.

Biography
Born July 5, 1937, in the family of the builder Zinovy Lazarevich Budnitsky. She graduated from VGIK, studied with Grigory Kozintsev.

From 1964 to 2003 she was an actress of the National Film Actors' Theatre. In the cinema since 1960.

TV presenter, the author of programs on TNT, NTV, and REN TV.

Personal life
He husband is Alexander Orlov, the film director. Foster daughter Daria Drozdovskaya, daughter of the tragically dead actress Mikaela Drozdovskaya (1937—1978).

Selected filmography
 1955: A Guest from Kuban as young collective farmer
 1963: The Alive and the Dead (Живые и мертвые) as Masha's friend
 1964: There Was an Old Couple (Жили-были старик со старухой) as fellow traveler
 1969: King Stag (Король-олень) as Serendipist girl
 1970: Sunflower (Подсолнухи) as bellhopper
 1970: The Crown of the Russian Empire, or Once Again the Elusive Avengers (Корона Российской империи, или Снова неуловимые) as emotional lady
 1972: Train Stop—Two Minutes (Стоянка поезда—две минуты) as Tamara Krasovskaya
 1978: The Woman who Sings (Женщина, которая поёт) as Masha
 1979: Nameless Star (Безымянная звезда) as Mrs. Ispas
 1980: The Garage (Гараж) as secretary
 1982: Station for Two (Вокзал для двоих) as Masha
 1982: Simply Awful! (Просто ужас!) as Varvara Ivanovna
 1988: Criminal talent (Криминальный талант) as Ustyuzhanina
 1989: A Bright Personality (Светлая личность) as guide
 1993: The Secret of Queen Anne or Musketeers Thirty Years After (Тайна королевы Анны, или Мушкетёры тридцать лет спустя) as Duchess of Orleans

References

External links
 
 Алла Будницкая—интервью журналу «Театрал»

1937 births
Living people
Actresses from Moscow
People's Artists of the RSFSR
Soviet film actresses
Soviet stage actresses
Soviet television actresses
Gerasimov Institute of Cinematography alumni
Russian film actresses
Russian stage actresses
Russian television actresses
Russian memoirists
Soviet Jews
Russian television presenters
Women memoirists
Russian women television presenters
Jewish Russian actors
20th-century Russian women